2MW, better known as Radio 97, is an Australian radio station serving the Murwillumbah region. It was opened in September 1937.

Controversy

Underpayment of Staff
Radio 97 owners, Broadcast Operations Group, have often been accused of a reluctance to pay experienced staff in order to cut operating costs.

In September 2009, Broadcast Operations Group was found to have underpaid a journalist and has been ordered to make a $10,000 backpayment. The journalist, who was studying communications at a Gold Coast university, worked part-time over a two-year period in the newsroom for Tweed Heads radio station Radio 97 was graded as a cadet. The Fair Work Ombudsman found that the Journalist was performing tasks that would normally be given to a Grade 1, Band 1 journalist under the Commercial Radio Journalists Award.

References

Radio stations established in 1937
Radio stations in New South Wales
Radio stations on the Gold Coast, Queensland
News and talk radio stations in Australia
Classic hits radio stations in Australia
Broadcast Operations Group